Andrew Best Weir (15 November 1937 – 1992) was a Scottish footballer who played as a winger for Motherwell and the Scotland national team. He earned a total of six caps for Scotland and scored his only goal on his debut, a 3–2 win against West Germany in 1959. His final international appearance was against Turkey in 1960.

Weir developed meningitis in 1961 which led to him being in a coma for five days in Ruchill Hospital, it was said that "only his high level of physical fitness helped him shake off the illness and survive".  A back injury shortly afterwards led to the end of his career. Despite 10 years at Motherwell which saw him score 57 major competition goals in 272 games, Weir was not given a benefit match; however fans of the club held a dance in his name and presented him with a "thank you" cheque worth, in his words "a lot of money".

Weir had nine children with his wife Margaret, and continued to stay in Ferguslie Park in Paisley before moving to Elderslie in the 1970s where he died on 11 May 1992, having been in poor health for some years.

See also
List of one-club men in association football

References

1937 births
1992 deaths
Scottish footballers
Scotland international footballers
Motherwell F.C. players
Association football wingers
Scottish Football League players
Scottish Football League representative players
Arthurlie F.C. players
Scotland under-23 international footballers
Footballers from Paisley, Renfrewshire
Scottish Junior Football Association players
Scotland junior international footballers